The brownback salamander (Eurycea aquatica) is a species of brook salamander. Its range includes parts of Alabama, Georgia, and Tennessee, where it occurs in natural freshwater springs typically abundant in watercress. Once considered an ecotype of the southern two-lined salamander, the brownback salamander was subsequently raised to full species status based on molecular evidence.

Naming and etymology
The genus "Eurycea" is mythological in origin and was first used by Rafinesque in 1822 to describe all brook salamanders. The specific epithet aquatica refers to the habits of E. aquatica being more aquatic than those of the closely related salamander E. cirrigera.

Range and habitat
The brownback salamander occurs in springs throughout the Southeast with verified localities existing in Alabama, Georgia, and Tennessee.

Physical characteristics
The brownback salamander is so-named for its brown color, which is in contrast with the yellow hue of southern two-lined salamanders. Members of the species are typically 30–40 mm. Males and females are sexually dimorphic in head shape with the males having broader heads. Males of the brownback salamander do not possess cirri, which distinguishes this species from other brook salamanders including the southern two-lined salamander.

References 

 , 1963, Tulane Stud. Zool., 10: 121.
 , 1998, Salamand. U.S. Canada: 241–242.

External links

AmphibiaWeb-Eurycea aquatica

Aquatica
Amphibians described in 1963